Secretariat of Cabinet of Ministers of Ukraine is a constantly acting body that ensures activities of the Cabinet of Ministers of Ukraine.

Overview
The main objective of the Secretariat is the organizational, expert-analytic, legal, informational, material-technical support for the Cabinet of Ministers of Ukraine, government committees, the Prime Minister of Ukraine, the First Vice-Prime Minister, Vice-Prime Ministers, the Minister of Cabinet of Ministers of Ukraine, and ministers without portfolio.

In its actions the Secretariat cooperates with the Presidential Administration of Ukraine, the Office of Verkhovna Rada, the Office of National Security and Defense Council of Ukraine, ministries and other central bodies of executive power, the Council of Ministers of Crimea and other Regional State Administrations (oblasts and cities), as well as other state institutions, bodies of a local self-government, public unions, enterprises, institutions and organizations.

Composition
 Leadership 
 Minister of Cabinet of Ministers
 First Deputy of the Minister
 other deputies
 Patronage services
 Office of the Prime Minister of Ukraine
 Service of the First Vice-Prime Minister
 Services of Vice-Prime Ministers
 Service of the Minister of Cabinet of Ministers
 Structural divisions - bureau, departments, independent agencies and offices, and other sub-divisions

References

External links

Secretariat of Cabinet of Ministers
 Secretariat of Cabinet of Ministers